

Portugal
 Angola – 
 Caetano Alexandre de Almeida e Albuquerque, Governor-General of Angola (1876–1878)
 Vasco Guedes de Carvalho e Meneses, Governor-General of Angola (1878–1880)

United Kingdom
 Jamaica – Sir Anthony Musgrave, Governor of Jamaica (1877–1883)
 Malta Colony
Charles van Straubenzee, Governor of Malta (1872–1878)
Arthur Borton, Governor of Malta (1878–1884)
 New South Wales – Hercules Robinson, Lord Rosmead, Governor of New South Wales (1872–1879)
 Queensland – Sir Arthur Kennedy, Governor of Queensland (1877–1883)
 Saint Lucia - Sir Arthur Elibank Havelock, Administrator of Saint Lucia (1878–1879)

 Tasmania – Major Frederick Weld, Governor of Tasmania (1875–1880)
 South Australia – Lieutenant-General William Jervois, Governor of South Australia (1877–1883)
 Victoria – George Bowen, Governor of Victoria (1873–1879)
 Western Australia – Major-General Harry Ord, Governor of Western Australia (1877–1880)

References

Colonial governors
Colonial governors
1878